The Humpy fly is a popular and effective dry fly used by fly anglers for trout in fast-water conditions.

In The Professionals’ Favorite Flies (1993) Lefty Kreh praises the Humpy as:

Origin
The Humpy style originated with an early 19th century fly called the Tom Thumb which was being tied in both the Eastern U.S. and Canada as well as England as late as the 1940s.
The Tom Thumb was a dry fly with two opposing clumps of deer hair over a colored thread body.

The Tom Thumb style was adapted in the late 1940s by California angler Jack Horner into a pattern he called the Horner Deer Hair fly, the first version of what is called the Humpy today.  When the pattern was introduced to fly shop owners in Montana in the 1950s, the pattern became known as the Goofus Bug.  Wyoming anglers started calling it the Humpy and the name stuck.

Imitates
The Humpy is an attractor style dry fly that imitates no particular prey for trout.  Its buggy appearance can resemble adult mayflies, caddisflies, stoneflies or terrestrial insects like grasshoppers.

Materials
 Hook: Dry fly 8-14
 Thread: 6/0, 8/0
 Tail: Deer, elk or moose hair
 Underbody: Floss, thread, foam, hackle
 Body: Deer, elk or moose hair
 Wing: Deer or elf hair
 Hackle: Dry fly hackle

Variations
As described in Trout Flies-The Tier's Reference (1999), Dave Hughes unless otherwise attributed 
 Royal Humpy
 Adams Humpy
 Blond Humpy
 Green Humpy

Notes

 
Dry fly patterns